Bourgeat S.A. is a French manufacturer of cookware and bakeware that primarily serves the commercial trade. The company has been in operation for over a century and has established itself as a trusted name in the industry.

History
Bourgeat S.A. was founded in 1918 by Victor-Auguste Bourgeat, a chef who saw a need for high-quality cookware in the commercial kitchen. The company initially produced kitchenware for both domestic and commercial markets, but in 1981 it shifted its focus to exclusively producing for the commercial market.

In 2002, Bourgeat S.A. merged with Matfer, another French manufacturer of cookware and kitchen utensils, to form the Matfer Bourgeat Group.

Awards
In the Chef's Choice Awards 2014, it won the Best Pan Award.

Structure
It is headquartered in Les Abrets-en-Dauphiné in the Isère department of the Auvergne-Rhône-Alpes region of south-east France.

It is a family-owned company.

See also
 Eva Trio, or Eva Solo, of Denmark
 Mauviel, similar French cookware company
 Le Pentole, of Italy

References

External links
 Bourgeat
 Matfer Bourgeat
 Matfer Bourgeat USA

Companies based in Auvergne-Rhône-Alpes
Isère
Kitchenware brands
Manufacturing companies established in 1918
Manufacturing companies of France